Maurice Darrow Bean (September 9, 1928 – November 30, 2009) of California served as United States Ambassador to Burma from September 1977 to August 1979. Prior to his appointment, he worked for the Peace Corps for 15 years, including as Operations Director in the Philippines.

Bean graduated from Howard University in 1950 with a B.A. in government and entered the Foreign Service in 1951.  He attended Haverford College, graduating in 1954 with a master's degree in social and technical assistance. In 1959, he received a postgraduate certificate in Advanced International Studies from 7Johns Hopkins University.

References

1928 births
2009 deaths
Ambassadors of the United States to Myanmar
African-American diplomats
Peace Corps directors
United States Foreign Service personnel
Howard University alumni
Haverford College alumni
20th-century African-American people
21st-century African-American people